Pascal Lainé (born 10 May 1942 in Anet, Eure-et-Loir) is a French academic, novelist, and writer.

Awarded both the Prix Médicis (1971 for l'Irrévolution) and the Goncourt (1974 for La Dentellière), Pascal Lainé has published over 20 novels and has written for television, theater, and film.

While recovering from childhood illnesses, Lainé discovered novelists Alexandre Dumas, père and Victor Hugo, aspiring to their kind of voluminous writing, but in school he focused on philosophy and history, becoming an avid student of Immanuel Kant, Maurice Merleau-Ponty, and Martin Heidegger.  He was also drawn to Marxism (both by conviction and from a desire to rile his parents) and he chose Russian as his second foreign language, permitting him to read Anton Chekhov and Fyodor Dostoyevsky in the original.

Lainé studied philosophy at l'École normale supérieure de Saint-Cloud and began his career as a teacher first at the Lycée technique de Saint-Quentin and later at the Lycée Louis-le-Grand in Paris.  He then became a professor in 1974 at the Institut universitaire de technologie in Villetaneuse.  He currently serves as an administrator at the Société des auteurs et compositeurs dramatiques (SACD).

With Rimbaud, he discovered the "fireworks" of poetry, and in Mallarmé he discovered the pleasure of deciphering a text and studying its structure.  He is also fascinated by Witold Gombrowicz: "I felt with this joker, this aristocratic Rabelais an instant kinship.  He taught me that a writer gives up his homeland and is always a foreigner wherever he finds himself."

Bibliography
 B comme Barrabas, Éditions Gallimard, 1967
 L'Irrévolution (novel), Gallimard,  1971 – Prix Médicis
 La Dentellière (novel), Gallimard,  1974 – Prix Goncourt
 Si on partait (novel), Gallimard, 1978
 L'Eau du miroir (novel), Mercure de France, 1979
 Tendres cousines (novel), Gallimard, 1979
 Terres des ombres (novel), Gallimard, 1982
 Les Petites Egarées (novel), 1988
 Dialogues du désir (novel), 1992
 L'Incertaine (novel), 1993
 Le Commerce des apparences (novel), 1997
 Anaïs nue (novel), 1999
 Derniers jours avant fermeture (novel), 2001
 Capitaine Bringuier (play)
 Monsieur vous oubliez votre cadavre
 Le mystère de la Tour Eiffel (novel), 2005
 Un clou chasse l'autre ou La vie d'artiste (essay), Punctum editions, 2006

1942 births
Living people
People from Eure-et-Loir
20th-century French novelists
21st-century French novelists
Writers from Centre-Val de Loire
ENS Fontenay-Saint-Cloud-Lyon alumni
Prix Goncourt winners
Prix Médicis winners
French male novelists
20th-century French male writers
21st-century French male writers